Tuomela is a Finnish surname. Notable people with the surname include:

Jessica Tuomela (born 1983), Canadian Paralympic swimmer
Marko Tuomela (born 1972), Finnish footballer
Raimo Tuomela (1940–2020), Finnish philosopher

Finnish-language surnames